The Phoenix Roadrunners were a minor league professional ice hockey team in the International Hockey League. The team was housed at Arizona Veterans Memorial Coliseum. The team played in the IHL from 1989 to 1997. The IHL Roadrunners were named for a World Hockey Association team of the same name. The IHL Roadrunners used a similar skating cartoon bird logo as the WHA team with different colors, without the outline of the state of Arizona. 

In 1996, the original Winnipeg Jets relocated to Phoenix, becoming the Coyotes. After one year competing with the Coyotes for fans, the Roadrunners folded at the end of the 1996-97 season. Coincidentally, the Coyote's AHL affiliate, the Tucson Roadrunners, share the name and similar logo to the displaced IHL team.

See also 
List of Phoenix Roadrunners (IHL) players

References 

International Hockey League (1945–2001) teams
Defunct ice hockey teams in the United States
Sports in Phoenix, Arizona
Ice hockey clubs established in 1989
Sports clubs disestablished in 1997
Ice hockey teams in Arizona
1989 establishments in Arizona
1997 disestablishments in Arizona